A juggler is a person who practices object manipulation for entertainment, sport or recreation. Famous professional jugglers have come from many countries and have performed their skills live in circuses, variety theatres, casinos, cruise ships, festivals, street venues and on television. This list shows notable jugglers for reasons of success as a professional performer, world record holder, official competition winner or inventor of patterns or tricks.

Australia
Space Cowboy

Austria 
 Christoph and Manuel Mitasch - hold multiple club passing numbers juggling world records

Canada
Wilfred Dubois (b. 1892)

Czech Republic 
 Alan Šulc - holds multiple bounce numbers juggling world records

Germany
Francis Brunn - numerous appearances on stage and television. 

Paul Cinquevalli
Thomas Dietz

Luca Pferdmenges - multiple Guinness world record holder and TikTok personality

Hungary 
 Trixie - known as 'the first lady of juggling'. Appearance on stage and film.

Italy
Enrico Rastelli - a former holder of multiple world records.

Netherlands
Niels Duinker - comedy juggler and holder of multiple Guinness World Records.

Russia (or the former USSR)
Vova and Olga Galchenko
Sergej Ignatov - former holder of various world records. Many appearances in circuses and on stage.

United Kingdom
Alex Barron - holds multiple ball numbers juggling world records
Sean Gandini - holds multiple ring passing numbers juggling world records
Rod Laver - notable for ping pong ball juggling routine. Numerous appearances on stage and television worldwide.
Haggis and Charlie - juggling performers, teachers and authors. Appearances at festivals, stage and television.

United States

W.C. Fields - Actor and vaudeville performer.
The Flying Karamazov Brothers - juggling and comedy troupe who have been performing since 1973.
Jason Garfield - president of the World Juggling Federation
Anthony Gatto - holds various number juggling world records, considered by many to be the world's greatest juggler.
Michael Goudeau - ex-circus clown and frequent collaborator of Penn Jillette.
Penn Jillette - half of the duo Penn & Teller, who incorporates his juggling skills into their magic act.
Albert Lucas - holds some number juggling world records. Club juggling trick 'Alberts' and by association 'Treblas' named after him. 
Marcus Monroe - Comedian and Juggler, Winner of the Andy Kaufman Award
Bobby May - vaudeville performer
Steve Mills - inventor of the juggling pattern Mills Mess
Michael Moschen - popularised contact juggling in 1990s

References

Further reading
Ziethen, Karl-Heinz & Serena, Alessandro 2003 Virtuosos of Juggling, Renegade Juggling, Santa Cruz 
Ziethen, Karl-Heinz & Allen, Andrew 1985 Juggling: The Art and its Artists, Werner Rausch & Werner Luft Inc, Berlin 
Summers, Kit 1987 
Juggling with Finesse, Finesse Press, San Diego 
Finnigan, Dave 1987 The Complete Juggler, Vintage Books, New York 
Dancey, Charlie 2001 Encyclopedia of Ball Juggling, Butterfingers, Devon 
Dancey, Charlie 1995 Compendium of Club Juggling Butterfingers, Bath 

Jugglers